The Nanxing Park is a park in Nangang District, Taipei, Taiwan.

History
The park was inaugurated in 1978 as a community park. In June 2018, the park underwent renovation and was reopened in October the same year.

Transportation
The park is accessible within walking distance north from Nangang Station.

See also
 List of parks in Taiwan

References

1978 establishments in Taiwan
Parks established in 1978
Parks in Taipei